Janus Chess is a chess variant invented in 1978 by Werner Schöndorf from Bildstock, Germany. It is played on a 10×8 board and features a fairy chess piece, the janus, with the combined moves of a bishop and a knight. The janus piece is named after the Roman god Janus because this god was usually depicted with two faces looking in opposite directions.

Description
The usual set of chess pieces is extended with two pawns and two januses per player. Each janus is placed between a rook and a knight. The relative position of the king and queen is reversed compared to chess. After castling, the king stands on either the b- or i-file and a rook stands on either the c- or h-file, depending on which side castling is done.

The janus is considered almost as powerful as a queen and is usually valued at about 8 points (based on chess piece values with pawns valued at 1). It is the only piece in the game that is able to checkmate the opponent's king without the assistance of any other piece, with the king in a corner and the janus two squares away on a diagonal, but this checkmate cannot be . Due to the extra pieces, each player starts the game with considerably more " power" compared to standard chess; however, the game has only a slightly higher material "power density", since there is more room for players to maneuver pieces because of the larger board (10×8 = 80 squares). Due to the different board and pieces, players are unable to use normal chess opening theory, and chess tablebases have limited value in the endgame.

Janus Chess has been popular in Europe with regular tournaments drawing strong players. Several chess grandmasters have played this game including Viktor Korchnoi, Péter Lékó and Artur Yusupov. Korchnoi said: "I like playing Janus Chess because one can show more creativity than in normal chess."

See also
Chess engines that play Janus Chess:
 ChessV
 Fairy-Max

References

External links
 Janus Chess by Hans L. Bodlaender, The Chess Variant Pages
 Janusschach Janus Chess 
 BrainKing.com play Janus Chess over an Internet server

Capablanca Chess variants
1978 in chess
Board games introduced in 1978